Xi Leonis (ξ Leo, ξ Leonis) is a solitary star in the zodiac constellation of Leo. It has an apparent visual magnitude of 5.0 and is faintly visible to the naked eye. The distance to this star, as determined by parallax measurements, is roughly 229 light years.

This is an evolved, K-type giant star with a stellar classification of K0 III. At an age of around four billion years, it has expanded to 12 times the radius of the Sun and shines with 60 times the Sun's luminosity. The effective temperature of the star's outer atmosphere is 4,688. In the General Catalogue of Variable Stars, it is listed as a suspected variable star based on a 1929 paper.

References

External links
 Xi Leonis in Hipparcos stars in Leo

K-type giants
Leo (constellation)
Leonis, Xi
Leonis, 05
082395
046771
3782
Suspected variables
Durchmusterung objects